Government Degree College, Kargil is the government general degree college in Kargil, in the union territory of Ladakh, India. It offers undergraduate courses in Science, Commerce and Arts. The college is affiliated to the University of Ladakh.

See also
Education in India
Eliezer Joldan Memorial College Leh, Ladakh

References

External links 
Government Degree College, Kargil
 University of Ladakh

University of Ladakh
Leh
Education in Ladakh
Colleges affiliated to University of Ladakh
Educational institutions established in 1995
1995 establishments in Jammu and Kashmir